Mona Ioane is a Cook Islands politician and former Cabinet Minister.  He is a member of the Cook Islands Party.

Ioane is a former police officer with 22 years experience.  He was elected to the Cook Islands Parliament for the seat of Vaipae–Tautu in the 2010 election.  His election was the subject of an electoral petition from losing Democratic Party candidate Kete Ioane, who alleged that he had used his position on the Aitutaki Cyclone Appeal committee to dispense aid to bribe voters. In April 2014, shortly before the 2014 election, he was appointed to Cabinet as Minister of Education and Tourism, replacing Teina Bishop. He was narrowly re-elected in 2014, but his election was challenged by an election petition, and in December 2014 it was voided after he was found guilty of bribery by the Court of Appeal. He subsequently contested and won the 2015 Vaipae-Tautu by-election, but was excluded from Cabinet. In September 2016 he was elected Deputy Speaker.

Ioane did not win re-election at the 2018 election, losing to Kitai Teinakore.

References

Living people
Members of the Parliament of the Cook Islands
Cook Islands Party politicians
Cook Island lawyers
People from Aitutaki
Year of birth missing (living people)
Government ministers of the Cook Islands